, better known by his stage name , is a Japanese DJ, record producer, and singer from Shizuoka, Shizuoka Prefecture. He is a member of Denki Groove.

Discography

Studio albums
 Dove Loves Dub (1995)
 Berlin Trax (1998)
 Throbbing Disco Cat (1999)
 Karaokejack (2001)
 The Album (2003) 
 Title #1 (2004)
 Title #2 + #3 (2004)
 C-46 (2006) 
 Ink Punk Phunk (2007) 
 Cruise (2010)
 Lunatique (2016)
 Acid Tekno Disko Beatz (2017)

Compilation albums
 Titles (2005)
 Euqitanul (2016)
 Wire Trax 1999-2012 (2012)
 Takkyu Ishino Works 1983-2017 (2018)

DJ mix albums
 Mix Up Vol. 1 (1995)
 DJF400 (1998)
 In the Box: Live at Womb Tokyo (2003)
 A Pack to the Future (2005)

Soundtrack albums
 Papa Semplicità (2003)

EPs
 Dove Loves Dub 4 Tracks (1995)
 Galactik Pizza Delivery Vol. 1 (1998)
 New Wave EP: Galactik Pizza Delivery Vol. 2 (1998) 
 Montag EP (1998)
 Loopa 000 (1998)
 Matadors of Techno EP (1999) 
 Technomusik Ab und Zu: Galactik Pizza Delivery Vol. 3 (2001) 
 Lunar EP Part 1 (2016)
 Lunar EP Part 2 (2016)
 Recycled Tracks Pt. 7 (2018)

Singles
 "Chime" (1995) 
 "Anna: Letmein Letmeout" (1999)
 "Feeling" (2000)
 "Suck Me Disco" (2001)
 "Stereo Nights" (2001)
 "Last Scene" (2001) 
 "Come Baby" (2002) 
 "Love Train" (2002) 
 "The Rising Suns" (2004)
 "Konya Dake" (2018) 
 "Mogura Tataki no Yō na Hito 2018" (2018) 
 "Turkish Smile" (2019)
 "Koyote Tango" (2019)
 "John Rydoon" (2019)
 "Chat on the Beach" (2019)
 "Bass Zombie" (2019)

References

External links
 Official website
 

1967 births
Living people
People from Shizuoka (city)
Musicians from Shizuoka Prefecture
Japanese male musicians
Japanese techno musicians
Japanese record producers
Japanese DJs
Ki/oon Music artists